The Location Managers Guild International Awards are awarded at an annual show honoring outstanding contributions to location scouting in the film and television industries. The Location Managers Guild held its inaugural show in March 2014 at the Writers Guild Theater in Beverly Hills, with honors going to Location Managers Robert Boake (Game of Thrones), Ilt Jones (Iron Man 3), David Doumeng & Charlie Love (Nike), and the Albuquerque Film Commission (Breaking Bad).

Following the success of its first year, the LMGI has since continued to honor the outstanding creative contributions of location professionals around the world annually, currently held in October, at the start of the Hollywood awards season in Los Angeles, CA.

Originally called the LMGA Awards, the name of the awards changed with the guild's name change to reflect the international nature of filmmaking to the LMGI Awards in 2016.

In addition to the awards given for the best location professional in film, television, commercials, and film commission, the LMGI presents honorary awards to a location professional for lifetime achievement, to a trailblazer who has been a leader in furthering the recognition of location professionals in motion picture and television, a humanitarian award, and the Eva Monley award for an entertainment industry professional that has demonstrated 'above and beyond' support of the work of location professionals.

LMGI Award winners and nominees
Winner in bold at the top of the list

2022
Date: August 27, 2022
Location: Los Angeles Center Studios
Host: Melissa Peterman
Notable Guests: James Cromwell, Alexis Floyd, Megan Henderson, Amy Hill, Kate Linder, and Paul Scheer

2021
Date: October 23, 2021 
Location: Held virtually due to the COVID-19 pandemic
Host: Isaiah Mustafa
Notable Guests: actors John Brotherton, Jim Cashman, Joel de la Fuente, Lesley Fera, Chris Geere, Harry Lennix, Camryn Manheim, Jon Seda, and Nadine Velazquez

{| class=wikitable width="100%"
|-
! colspan="3"| LMGI Award for Outstanding use of Locations
|-
|-
!width="200"|Award
!width="400"|Project
!width="400"|Recipient
|-
|rowspan="5" style="text-align:center;"|Outstanding Locations in a Contemporary Film|| Tenet - Warner Bros||Janice Polley, Julie Hannum, Klaus Darrelman|-
|• Black Is King - Disney|| Jason Wisch, Vincent Vanni
|-
| • Concrete Cowboy - Netflix|| Christopher Gormley, Staci Hagenbaugh
|-
| • Nomadland – Searchlight|| Nathan D. Harrison
|-
| • A Quiet Place Part II - Paramount|| Mara Alcaly, Joe Mullaney, John Hutchinson
|-
|rowspan="5" style="text-align:center;"|Outstanding Locations in a Period Film||Judas and the Black Messiah - Warner Bros|| Bill Garvey, Tim Kanieski|-
|• Dreamland – Paramount|| Ashley Valdez, Clay DeVelvis
|-
| • Enola Holmes – Netflix|| Bill Darby, Jess MacDonald
|-
| • Mank - Netflix|| William Doyle, Walter Roshetski
|-
| • The Trial of the Chicago 7 – Netflix|| Nick Rafferty, Dennis Vozkov
|-
|rowspan="6" style="text-align:center;"|Outstanding Locations in Contemporary Television||Lupin – Netflix||Thomas De Sambi, Valerie Segond|-
| • The Handmaid’s Tale – Hulu|| Anne Richardson, Jeremy Pinard
|-
| • The Mosquito Coast – Apple TV+|| Eric Stangeland, Horacio Rodriguez, Bob Lepucki, Isaias Galicia Morales
|-
| • Warrior Nun – Netflix|| Tate Aráez, Kico Aráez
|-
| • Woke – Hulu|| Kent Sponagle, John Alexander
|-
| • Yellowstone Season 3 – Paramount|| Charlie Skinner, David Zachary Heine
|-
|rowspan="6" style="text-align:center;"|Outstanding Locations in Period Television|| The Crown Season 4 – Netflix||Mark Walledge, Tate Aráez|-
|• Bridgerton – Netflix|| Paul Tomlinson
|-
|• Fargo Season 4 – FX|| Nick Rafferty
|-
| • The Nevers – HBO|| Jethro Ensor, Elena Vakirtzis
|-
| • Ratched – Netflix|| Robert Foulkes, Adam Robinson
|-
| • Snowfall – FX|| Manny Padilla, James Gierman
|-
|rowspan="6" style="text-align:center;"|Outstanding Locations in Limited Anthology Television||The Queen’s Gambit – Netflix||David Pieper, Stefan Wöhleke, Matt Graver, Fred Kamping|-
|• Halston – Netflix|| Christopher Britton, Amanda Foley-Burbank
|-
|• Mare of Easttown – HBO|| Brian O’Neill
|-
| • The Serpent – BBC|| Poj Udomsong Aram, Thitikorn Sriborisut
|-
| • The Stand – Paramount|| Matt Palmer, Courtney Ashforth, Mitchell Gutman
|-
| • The Underground Railroad – Amazon|| Alison A. Taylor, Angie Morrison
|-
|rowspan="5" style="text-align:center;"|Outstanding Locations in a Commercial||Apple Watch - "It Already Does That" - MJZ||Matt DeLoach, Jof Hanwright, Brent Gaffan, Galidan Nauber|-
|• Extra Gum, "For When It’s Time”  – MJZ|| Daniela Aguilera, Debi Castro, Carlos Cofré, Carlos Simón Santis
|-
|• Fundacion Argentina de Trasplante Hepatico, "Match" – Primo||Hernan Dal Maso, Jose Varamo
|-
|• Nike, “Play New" – Somesuch|| Florian Schura, Michael Dennehy, Michael Fricke, Travis Diener, Steve Kovacic, Alistair Vlok
|-
|• Sony, “Create the Beyond" – Hero Productions|| Alfred Gislason, Gudfinnur Ymir Hardarson, Birkir Bibbi Grétarsson
|-
|rowspan="6" style="text-align:center;"|Outstanding Film Commission||Beth Nelson - Savannah Regional Film Commission||Underground Railroad|-
|• Bath Film Office||Bridgerton
|-
|• Estonian Film Institute/Film Estonia||Tenet
|-
|• Hamilton Music and Film Office||Umbrella Academy
|-
|• Liverpool Film Office||Tin Star: Liverpool
|-
|• Screen Queensland Australia||Love and Monsters
|-
|}

2020Date: October 24, 2020 Location: Held virtually due to the COVID-19 pandemicHost: Isaiah MustafaNotable Guests: Director Edgar Wright, and actors Jim Cashman, Sylvia Hoeks, Damaris Lewis, Graham McTavish, Joe Mantegna, Blair Underwood, Tim Williams, Noah Wyle

{| class=wikitable width="100%"
|-
! colspan="3"| LMGI Award for Outstanding use of Locations
|-
|-
!width="200"|Award!width="400"|Project!width="400"|Recipient|-
|rowspan="5" style="text-align:center;"|Outstanding Locations in a Contemporary Film|| The Last Black Man in San Francisco - A24||Daniel Lee|-
|• 6 Underground - Skydance Media/Netflix|| Enrico Latella, Simon Crook
|-
| • Da 5 Bloods - 40 Acres and a Mule Filmworks/Netflix|| Nui Voradet Emeam
|-
| • Extraction – Netflix|| Mary Baltrop
|-
| • The Peanut Butter Falcon - Roadside Attractions|| Jody Schiesser
|-
|rowspan="6" style="text-align:center;"|Outstanding Locations in a Period Film||Once Upon a Time in Hollywood - Columbia Pictures|| Rick Schuler, Steve Mapel|-
|• 1917 – DreamWorks Pictures|| Emma Pill
|-
| • Dolemite Is My Name – Netflix|| David B Lyons, Russel Hadaya
|-
| • A Hidden Life - Fox Searchlight Pictures|| Markus Bensch, Leo Baumgartner
|-
| • Jojo Rabbit – Fox Searchlight Pictures|| Jan Adler
|-
| • Little Women – Sony Pictures|| Douglas Dresser, Kyle "Snappy" Oliver 
|-
|rowspan="6" style="text-align:center;"|Outstanding Locations in Contemporary Television||Killing Eve – BBC America||Jamie Parsons, Jordi Utset, Lucian Asan|-
| • Giri/Haji – BBC2/Netflix|| Antonia Grant, Idris Ahmed, Tooru Hayakawa, Katsumasa Morita
|-
| • Goliath – Amazon Studios|| Scott Poole, Errol Reichow
|-
| • Messiah – Netflix|| Wendell Hinkle, Marco Giacalone, Hilton Clay Peres
|-
| • Treadstone – USA Network|| Imre Légmån
|-
| • White Lines – Netflix|| Germån Traver, Leon Seth
|-
|rowspan="6" style="text-align:center;"|Outstanding Locations in Period Television|| Perry Mason – HBO||Jonathan Jansen, Alexander Georges, Brian Kinney, Alex Moreno|-
|• Babylon Berlin – Sky 1|| David Pieper
|-
|• The Crown (season 3) – Netflix|| Pat Karam, Pedro "Tate" Aråez 
|-
| • See – Apple TV+|| Trevor Brokop, Nick Bergstedt, Michael Gazetas
|-
| • Westworld (season 3) – HBO|| Mandi Dillin, Michael Wesley
|-
| • Wu-Tang: An American Saga – Hulu|| Rob Coleman, Mike Mizrahi, Dexter Wiseman
|-
|rowspan="5" style="text-align:center;"|Outstanding Locations in Limited Anthology Television||Little America – Apple TV+ (tie) ZeroZeroZero – StudioCanal/Amazon Studios||Mike Hartel, Rocco Nisivoccia, Adrian Knight (tie) Gianni Antonio Grazioli, Christian Peritore, Juan Pablo Noval, Lily Flaschner, Virginia McCollam, Babacar Seck, Zoubir Belgsir, Hicham Jamaledine|-
|• Belgravia – Epix|| Mark "Sparky" Ellis
|-
|• Catherine the Great – HBO|| Vytautas Riabovas, Kestas Cicenasas, Svetlana Lukash
|-
| • The Plot Against America – HBO|| Matthew Kania
|-
| • The Spy (TV series) – Netflix|| Rabi El Bakki, Zsuzsa Gregua, Zsolt Valkony
|-
|rowspan="6" style="text-align:center;"|Outstanding Locations in a Commercial||"Mask of the Zodiac” - Stink Shanghai||Ben Qian, Allen Cao|-
|• Ford, "Human Power" – Primo|| Alejando Bresciani
|-
|• Georgetown Optician, "Eyes Say More Than Words" – Design Army|| Dean Alexander
|-
|• Gucci, "Of Course A Horse" – GE Projects|| Beau Bright
|-
|• Renault Clio, "The French Exchange" – Academy Films|| Mark Jones, Eugene Strange
|-
|• Sprite, "You Are Not Alone" – Primo|| Hernan Dal Maso
|-
|rowspan="5" style="text-align:center;"|Outstanding Film Commission||Toscana Film Commission||Stefania Ippoliti|-
|• Abu Dhabi Film Commission||Jassim Al Nowais
|-
|• Berlin Brandenburg Film Commission||Christiane Raab
|-
| • The Municipality of Port Hope Marketing & Tourism Office||Kevin Narraway
|-
|• New Jersey Motion Picture & Television Commission||Michael Uslan
|-
|}

2019Date: September 21, 2019 Location: The Eli & Edythe Broad Stage at SMC Performing Arts Center, Santa Monica, CA Host: AJ GibsonNotable Guests: Director Claire Scanlon, producer Duncan Henderson, actors Michael Ealy, Regina King, Joe Mantegna, Holland Taylor

2018Date: April 7, 2018 Location: Alex Theatre, Glendale, CA Host: Jonah Ray Notable Guests: Writer Laeta Kalogridis, actors Kevin Daniels, Dennis Haysbert, Tracie Thoms

{| class=wikitable width="100%"
|-
! colspan="2"| LMGI Award for Outstanding use of Locations
|-
! width="50%"| Outstanding Locations in Contemporary Film
! width="50%"| Outstanding Locations in Period Film
|-
| valign="top" |Baby Driver – Doug Dresser, Kyle Hinshaw The Florida Project – Stacey McGillis
 Lady Bird – Michael Smith
 Logan – Maria Bierniak
 Three Billboards Outside Ebbing, Missouri – Robert Foulkes
| valign="top" |Dunkirk – Ben Piltz, Arnaud Kaiser All the Money in the World – Steve Mortimore, Enrico Latella
 American Made – Michael Burmeister, Michael Haro
 Atomic Blonde – Bea Beliczai, Klaus Darrelmann
 Mudbound – Wise Wolfe, Imre Legman
 Phantom Thread – Jason Wheeler
|-
! Outstanding Locations in Contemporary Television
! Outstanding Locations in Period Television
|-
| valign="top" |Ozark – Wes Hagan, Kevin Dowling Big Little Lies – Greg Alpert
 Black Mirror: Arkangel – Malcolm McCulloch
 Fargo – Robert Hilton
 The Handmaid's Tale – John Musikka, Geoffrey Smither
| valign="top" |Game of Thrones – Robert Boake, Matt Jones, Pedro Tate Araez The Crown – Pat Karam and Robert Bentley
 The Deuce – Chris George, Pat Weber Sones
 The Marvelous Mrs. Maisel – Amanda Foley-Burbank, Jose Guerrero
 Stranger Things – Tony Holley, Kyle Carey
 Taboo – Tom Howard
|-
! Outstanding Locations in a Commercial
! Outstanding Film Commission
|-
| valign="top" |Volkswagen "Atlas" – Charlie Love, Jof Hanwright, John Hutchinson Coca-Cola – Doug Dresser, Stephenson Crossley, Charles Furer
 Nike "Equality" – Jenny Caloca, Wilson Wu, Kathy Ruggeri
 North Face "Ventrix" – Beth Melnick, Don Baldwin, Cristobal Fleischmann
 Richmond Tourism BC – Christian Laub, David Angelski
| valign="top" |Atlanta Mayor's Office of Film and Entertainment Film LA
 New Mexico Film Office
 Visit Sacramento
 Vietnam Cinema Department
|-
! colspan="2"| LMGI Honorary Awards
|-
! Lifetime Achievement Award
! Trailblazer Award
|-
| valign="top" |
 Rino Pace| valign="top" |
 Josh Karan|-
! Humanitarian Award
! Eva Monley Award
|-
| valign="top" |
 Not Awarded
| valign="top" |
 Not Awarded
|-
|}

2017Date: April 8, 2017 Location: Warner Bros. Studios, Burbank, CA Host: Rico Gagliano Notable Guests: Directors Joe Pytka and Brad Silberling, author Michael Connelly, actors Amir Talai and Katherine Von Till

2016Date: April 23, 2016 Location: Alex Theatre, Glendale, CA Host: David Doumeng (2014 LMGA Award recipient) Notable Guests: Directors Christopher Guest and Michael Mann, actors Jeff Goldblum, Tony Revolori, Milana Vayntrub

{| class=wikitable width="100%"
|-
! colspan="2"| LMGI Award for Outstanding use of Locations
|-
! width="50%"| Outstanding Locations in Contemporary Film
! width="50%"| Outstanding Locations in Period Film
|-
| valign="top" |
 Sicario – S Todd Christensen and Shani Orona Blackhat – Janice Polley and Julie Hannum
 Black Mass – Charlie Harrington and Benjamin Dewey
 Creed – Patricia Taggart and Dan Gorman
 Our Brand Is Crisis – Batou Chandler and Luis Estrella
| valign="top" |
 The Revenant – Robin Mounsey and Bruce Brownstein Bridge of Spies – Klaus Darrelmann and Markus Bensch
 Mad Max: Fury Road – Simon Crook and Paul Tomlinson
 Straight Outta Compton – Alison A Taylor
 Trumbo – David Thornsberry
|-
! Outstanding Locations in Contemporary Television
! Outstanding Locations in Period Television
|-
| valign="top" |
 Sense8 – Marco Giacalone and Bill Bowling Bosch – Robert Paulsen and Paul Schreiber
 Better Call Saul – Christian Diaz de Bedoya
 Mr. Robot - Demian Resnick
 True Detective – Michael Chickey and Caleb Duffy
| valign="top" |
 Game of Thrones – Robert Boake and Pedro Tate Araez Aquarius – Michael Haro and Stacey Brashear
 Fargo – Matt Palmer and Rob Hilton
 Gotham – Keith Adams and Pat Sones
 Sleepy Hollow – Nancy Haecker and Ryan Taylor
|-
! Outstanding Locations in a Commercial
! Outstanding Film Commission
|-
| valign="top" |
 Chevrolet "Chevy Anthem" – Sean Alquist, Jikesh Shah 
 Apple "History of Sound" – Peter Orth, David Henriksen and David McKinney
 Budweiser "Lost Dog" – Patrick Riley
 Facebook "Friend Request" – Adam Butt and Wilson Wu
 Toyota "Let's Go Places" – Scott Logan and Scott Trimble
| valign="top" |
 Film LA Albuquerque Film Commission
 Berlin Brandenburg Film Commission
 Comisión de Filmaciones de la Ciudad de México
 Royal Film Commission of Jordan
|-
! colspan="2"| LMGI Honorary Awards
|-
! Lifetime Achievement Award
! Trailblazer Award
|-
| valign="top" |
 Janice Polley| valign="top" |
 Steve Dayan 
|-
! Humanitarian Award
! Eva Monley Award
|-
| valign="top" |
 Amy Brenneman and Brad Silberling| valign="top" |
 Wes Anderson|-
|}

2015Date: March 7, 2015 Location: Wallis Annenberg Center for the Performing Arts, Beverly Hills, CA Host: David Doumeng (2014 LMGA Award recipient) Notable Guests: Debbie Allen, Tony Denison, Ted Lange, Alfre Woodard

{| class=wikitable width="100%"
|-
! colspan="2"| LMGA Award for Outstanding use of Locations
|-
! width="50%"| Outstanding Locations in Contemporary Film
! width="50%"| Outstanding Locations in Period Film
|-
| valign="top" |
 Wild – Nancy Haecker Chef – Kei Rowan-Young
 Gone Girl – Rick Schuler and Steve Mapel
 Nightcrawler – Curtis Collins and Mike Brewer
 The Gambler – Chris Baugh
| valign="top" |
 The Grand Budapest Hotel – Klaus Darrelmann Fury – Russell Lodge and Lee Robertson
 Inherent Vice – Larry Ring and Scott Fitzgerald
 Selma – Wes Hagen and Leif Tilden
 The Imitation Game – David Broder and Richard George
|-
! Outstanding Locations in Contemporary Television
! Outstanding Locations in Period Television
|-
| valign="top" |
 True Detective – Batou Chandler Homeland – Robert Bentley and Deon du Preez
 Nashville – Kristi Frankenheimer and Mark Ragland
 NCIS: Los Angeles – Tony Salome and Jason Savage
 Ray Donovan – Craig van Gundy and Boyd Wilson
| valign="top" |
 Boardwalk Empire – Amanda Foley and Audra Gorman American Horror Story – John Johnson
 Forever – Guy Efrat
 Turn: Washington's Spies – Tom Trigo and Becky Beckstoffer
|-
! Outstanding Locations in a Single Commercial
! Outstanding Locations in a Commercial Campaign
|-
| valign="top" |
 Coca-Cola, "America is Beautiful" – Jimmy Ayoub, Cindy McCrossen, Peter Orth, Stephen Pherigo Budweiser "Always There" – JJ Levine and Byll Williams
 Nissan "Fly by Night" – Gil Evans, Marie-Paule Goislard, Beth Tate
 Nissan Altima "Migration" – Crofton Diack and Mike Floyd
 Honda Civic "Today is Pretty Great" – Jof Hanwright, Jesse Rivard
| valign="top" |
 "Ram Trucks"'' – David McKinney and Peter Orth
 "Subaru Outback" – Alissa Desler and Lori Allen
|-
! colspan="2"| Outstanding Film Commission
|-
| colspan="2" valign="top" |
 Long Beach Office of Special Events and Filming
 Chicago Film Office
 Film in Iceland
 Oregon Governor's Office of Film & Television
 Royal Film Commission of Jordan
|-
! colspan="2"| LMGA Honorary Awards
|-
! Lifetime Achievement Award
! Trailblazer Award
|-
| valign="top" |
 Kokayi Ampah
| valign="top" |
 Marino Pascal
|-
! Humanitarian Award
! Eva Monley Award
|-
| valign="top" |
 Caroline Baron – FilmAid International
| valign="top" |
 Not Awarded
|-
|}

2014
Date: March 29, 2014 
Location: Writers Guild Theater, Beverly Hills, CA 
Host: Jamie Kaler 
Notable Guests: AMPAS President Cheryl Boone Isaacs, actors Shari Belafonte, Billy Crystal, Kate Linder

List of multiple winners and nomineesThe following list is arranged by number of wins, nominations, and last name in order of preference (current as of November 2020) :''

3+ Location Manager Wins
 Robert Boake (3 wins, 4 nominations)
 Charlie Love (3 wins, 3 nominations)
 Pedro Tate Araez (3 wins, 4 nominations)
 Ben Piltz (3 wins, 3 nominations)

2+ Location Manager Wins
 Wes Hagen (2 wins, 3 nominations)
 Peter Orth (2 wins, 3 nominations)
 David Doumeng (2 wins, 2 nominations)
 Klaus Darrelman (2 win, 5 nominations)

3+ Location Manager Nominations
 Robert Bentley (1 win, 3 nominations)
 Amanda Foley-Burbank (1 win, 3 nominations)
 Mandi Dillin (1 win, 3 nominations)
 Doug Dresser (1 win, 3 nominations)
 Jof Hanwright (1 win, 3 nominations)
 Pat Karam (1 win, 3 nominations)
 JJ Levine (1 win, 3 nominations)
 Steve Mapel (1 win, 3 nominations)
 Rick Schuler (1 win, 3 nominations)
 Christian Diaz de Bedoya (3 nominations)
 Byll Williams (3 nominations)

3+ Television Series Wins
 Game of Thrones (4 wins, 6 nominations)

2+ Television Series Nominations
 The Crown (2 win, 4 nominations)
 Westworld (1 win, 3 nominations)
 Killing Eve (1 win, 2 nominations)
 True Detective (1 win, 2 nominations)
 Breaking Bad (2 nominations)
 Better Call Saul (2 nominations)
 Bosch (2 nominations)
 Fargo (2 nominations)
 Goliath (2 nominations)
 House of Cards (2 nominations)
 Man in the High Castle (2 nominations)
 The Marvelous Mrs Maisel (2 nominations)
 NCIS: Los Angeles (2 nominations)
 Stranger Things (2 nominations)

Wins by Network/Studio
 HBO (9 wins, 19 nominations)
 Netflix (5 wins, 22 nominations)
 Fox/Searchlight/FX (5 wins, 16 nominations)
 Amazon (2 wins, 13 nominations)
 Sony/Columbia (2 wins, 10 nominations)
 BBC (2 wins, 5 nominations)
 Lionsgate (2 wins, 4 nominations)
 Warner Brothers (1 win, 10 nominations)
 AMC (1 win, 7 nominations)
 Paramount (1 win, 5 nominations) 
 A24 (1 win, 2 nominations)
 Apple TV+ (1 win, 2 nominations)
 Marvel (1 win, 2 nominations)

2+ Film Commission Nominations
 Royal Film Commission of Jordan  (1 win, 3 nominations)
 Film LA (1 win, 3 nominations)
 Albuquerque Film Commission (1 win, 2 nominations)
 Long Beach Film Commission (1 win, 2 nominations)
 Film in Iceland (2 nominations)
 New Mexico Film Commission (2 nominations)

References

American film awards
American television awards
Awards established in 2014
Guild awards
International film awards